The Jardin botanique des oiseaux is a botanical garden on the grounds of the Maison Botanique in the Espace Découverte Nature et Patrimoine, located on Le Bourg, Saint-Barthélemy-de-Bussière, Dordogne, Aquitaine, France. The garden contains plants providing fruits, berries, and seeds that attract a variety of birds. It is open weekday afternoons; admission is free.

See also 
 List of botanical gardens in France

References 
 Perigord Vert entry (French)
 Gralon.net entry (French)
 Tourisme Aquitaine article (French)
 Parc Naturel Perigord-Limousin entry (French)

Oiseaux, Jardin botanique des
Oiseaux, Jardin botanique des